Marilla can refer to:
 Marilla, New York
 Marilla Township, Michigan
 Marilla Ricker, American Suffragist
 Marilla Cuthbert, a primary character in the novel Anne of Green Gables and its sequels